Durkan's test is a medical procedure to diagnose a patient with carpal tunnel syndrome. It is a new variation of Tinel's sign that was proposed by JA Durkan in 1991.

Process
Examiner presses thumbs over carpal tunnel and holds pressure for 30 seconds.  An onset of pain or paresthesia in the median nerve distribution within 30 seconds is a positive result of the test.

Accuracy
In studies of diagnostic accuracy, the sensitivity of Durkan's test ranged from 87% to 91% and its specificity from 90% to 95%.

Comparison
Durkan's test is more sensitive than Tinel's sign and Phalen maneuver.

References

Diagnostic neurology
Physical examination